Kenneth Flint (12 November 1923 – 21 May 2010) was a professional footballer who played for Bedford Town, Tottenham Hotspur, Aldershot, Leyton Orient and Bath City.

Playing career 
Flint joined Tottenham Hotspur from non-League club Bedford Town in 1948. The forward played five matches and scored one goal for the Lilywhites. After leaving White Hart Lane, Flint joined Aldershot where he featured in 324 matches and netting 70 goals between 1950 and 1958. He went on to have a spell at Leyton Orient before moving to Bath City during the 1958–59 season. After that, he played for Sittingbourne.

Death 
Flint spent his later years living in Enfield. He died on 21 May 2010, aged 86 at Barnet Hospital.

References

External links 
 Ken Flint in the Spurs team photo of 1949
Photo of Flint at Aldershot F.C.

1923 births
2010 deaths
People from Selston
Footballers from Nottinghamshire
English footballers
Bedford Town F.C. players
Tottenham Hotspur F.C. players
Aldershot F.C. players
Leyton Orient F.C. players
Bath City F.C. players
English Football League players
Association football forwards